The Colorado Department of Revenue (DOR) is a state agency in Colorado. The department collects most types of taxes and issues state identification cards and driver licenses and also enforces Colorado laws regarding gaming, liquor, tobacco, racing, auto dealers, and marijuana.

Divisions
 Taxation Division: https://www.colorado.gov/tax

 Division of Motor Vehicles: https://www.colorado.gov/dmv 
 Enforcement Division: https://www.colorado.gov/enforcement
Auto Industry Division: https://www.colorado.gov/pacific/enforcement/aid
Division of Gaming: https://www.colorado.gov/pacific/enforcement/gaming 
Liquor Enforcement Division: https://www.colorado.gov/pacific/enforcement/liquor 
Marijuana Enforcement Division: https://www.colorado.gov/pacific/enforcement/marijuanaenforcement 
Division of Racing: https://www.colorado.gov/pacific/enforcement/racing 
 Colorado Lottery: https://www.coloradolottery.com/en/

See also
 Colorado Department of the Treasury
 Direct Marketing Ass'n v. Brohl

References

External links
 
 Colorado Department of Revenue Enforcement
 Colorado Department of Revenue in the Code of Colorado Regulations

State agencies of Colorado
US state tax agencies
1941 establishments in Colorado